Eucyrta is a genus of moths in the family Erebidae erected by Felder in 1874.

Species
Eucyrta albicollis

Former species
Eucyrta venusta

References

Phaegopterina
Moth genera